De Pers (literal translation: The Press) was a freely distributed Dutch language tabloid newspaper in the Netherlands, with a circulation of around 200,000. Its competitors were Metro and Sp!ts. The first edition of De Pers was published on 23 January 2007 and its last edition was published 30 March 2012.

External links
 

2007 establishments in the Netherlands
2012 disestablishments in the Netherlands
Defunct newspapers published in the Netherlands
Dutch-language newspapers
Daily newspapers published in the Netherlands
Mass media in Amsterdam
Publications established in 2007
Publications disestablished in 2012